This is a list of episodes from the 2008-09 TV series The Mr. Men Show.

Series overview

Episodes

Season 1 (2008)

season 3 (2010)
1 dgsa
2 mr grumpy vs  mr happy vs mr greedy 
3 pizza garlic bread lava cake truffle cake sundae pasta burger french fries
4 upest 
5 mr fussy and mr strong

Season 2 (2009)

External links
 

Mr Men